Alexander Rigby (22 August 1620 – February, 1694) was an English politician who sat in the House of Commons  in 1659 and 1660.

Rigby was the son of Alexander Rigby of Middleton in Goosnargh near Preston and his wife Lucy Legh of Manchester. He succeeded father at Middleton in 1650.

In 1659, Rigby was elected Member of Parliament for Lancashire in the Third Protectorate Parliament.  In April 1660 he was elected MP for  Preston in the Convention Parliament, but was unseated on petition.

Rigby died at the age of  73 and was buried on 4 March 1694.

References

1620 births
1694 deaths
Place of birth missing
Politicians from Preston, Lancashire
English MPs 1659
English MPs 1660
Members of the Parliament of England (pre-1707) for Lancashire
Lancashire Militia officers